Jenna Weiss-Berman (born 1983) is a podcast producer and co-founder of Pineapple Street Media. Formerly she was director of audio for BuzzFeed.

Early life
Weiss-Berman is a native of Massachusetts and graduated from Oberlin College in 2005.

Career

BuzzFeed 
After almost a decade working in public radio on such shows as The Moth, WNYC's Death, Sex and Money, and The Longform Podcast, Weiss-Berman started the podcast department at BuzzFeed where she was "responsible for the ground-up development of the wildly successful company’s audio arm," creating shows like Another Round and Women of the Hour with Lena Dunham. While there she was responsible for every aspect of the podcast department from legal contracts, finding sponsorships and the content itself as a producer.

Pineapple Street Media 
In 2016, she left BuzzFeed to launch Pineapple Street Media, a Brooklyn-based full-service podcast production company, with her friend, Longform co-founder, Max Linsky. Weiss-Berman has said that the goal was to be able to make podcasts for non-audio companies and the decision to launch Pineapple Street came after both her and Linksy turning down many such requests.

Pineapple Street's early clients included The New York Times, Lena Dunham's Lenny Letter, and ad agency Wieden+Kennedy. In the summer of 2016, Hillary Clinton's presidential campaign hired Pineapple Street to produce a podcast (the first ever for a presidential candidate). Clinton and Linsky co-hosted the show, called With Her.

Pineapple Street Media has partnered with brands like Coach, Nike, Morgan Stanley, Mailchimp, Mastercard and Google, and produced critically-acclaimed original series like Missing Richard Simmons, Running From COPS, The Clearing, The Catch and Kill Podcast with Ronan Farrow, Wind of Change, Back Issue and Welcome to Your Fantasy.

In 2017, she was named one of Fast Company’s 100 Most Creative People in Business.

Pineapple Street was sold to Entercom in 2019.

Other 
Weiss-Berman currently sits on the advisory board of The Moth.

Awards 
Weiss-Berman was a winner of the Gracie Award Grand Award for Podcast in 2016, for her collaboration with Lena Dunham on podcast Woman of the Hour, initially produced at BuzzFeed, now a Pineapple Street production.

In 2020, Pineapple Street Media led all podcast companies with two Peabody Award nominations for The Catch and Kill Podcast with Ronan Farrow and Running From COPS.

Personal life
Weiss-Berman is married to writer Kira Garcia.

References

Living people
1983 births
American women podcasters
American podcasters
21st-century American women